Hammersø (English: Hammer Lake), or Hammer Sø, is the largest lake on the island of Bornholm and the only tarn in Denmark. It is located in a valley in Hammeren, the northernmost point of the island. A narrow isthmus separates the lake from Opalsø, an artificial lake formed in a granite quarry which was closed in 1970.

Geography

Biology

References

Geography of Bornholm
Lakes of Denmark